The girls' combined competition of the alpine skiing events at the 2012 Winter Youth Olympics in Innsbruck, Austria, was held on January 15, at the Patscherkofel. 42 athletes from 35 different countries took part in this event.

Results
The race was started at 10:15.

References

Alpine skiing at the 2012 Winter Youth Olympics
Youth